Wolfsburg is a 2003 German film directed by Christian Petzold, starring Benno Fürmann, Nina Hoss and Astrid Meyerfeldt.

Cast 
 Benno Fürmann  as Philipp Gerber
 Nina Hoss as Laura Reiser
 Antje Westermann as Katja
 Astrid Meyerfeldt as Vera
 Matthias Matschke as Scholz
 Soraya Gomaa as Françoise
 Stephan Kampwirth as Klaus

Awards
 Berlin International Film Festival FIPRESCI award in panorama (2003)
 Adolf Grimme golden award (2005)

References

External links
 

2003 films
Films directed by Christian Petzold
German drama films
2000s German-language films
Grimme-Preis for fiction winners
2000s German films